This is the discography of gospel artist Marvin Sapp. Sapp has a gold-selling album. Sapp has release eleven albums, two compilations albums, and a Christmas album. He has released twelve singles, of which the most successful was his platinum-selling 2007 release Never Would Have Made It, which peaked at number one on the gospel charts and number 86 on the Billboard 100. In total, Sapp has two BET Awards, one GMA Dove Awards, eleven Stellar Awards, and has been nominated for eleven Grammy Awards.

Solo albums

Compilations

Christmas albums

Singles

References

Discographies of American artists
Christian music discographies